Cache Public Schools is a public school district located in Cache, Oklahoma.

List of schools

Secondary schools
Cache High School
Cache Mid-High School

Middle schools
Cache Middle School

Primary schools
Cache Elementary
Cache Intermediate

References

School districts in Oklahoma
Education in Comanche County, Oklahoma
School districts established in 1902
1902 establishments in Oklahoma Territory